Kush or Cush may refer to:

Bible
 Cush (Bible), two people and one or more places in the Hebrew Bible

Places
 Kush (mountain), a mountain near Kalat, Pakistan Balochistan
 Kush (satrapy), a satrapy of the Achaemenid Empire
 Hindu Kush, a mountain range in Afghanistan
 Kingdom of Kush, an ancient kingdom in Nubia
 Cush (hill), a mountain in County Tipperary, Ireland

People

Given name
 Kush Arora, dub and bhangra music producer from San Francisco
 Cush Jumbo (born 1985), English actress
 Kusha (Ramayana), one of the twin sons of Lord Rama and Sita

Surname
 Lennox Cush (born 1974), Guyanese–American cricketer
 Wilbur Cush (1928–1981), Northern Irish football player
 Emil Kush (1916–1969), American baseball player
 Eric Kush (born 1989), American football player
 Frank Kush (1929–2017), American football coach
 Kundan Singh Kush (1881–1967), Arya Samaj missionary
 Rod Kush (born 1956), American football player
 Vladimir Kush (born 1965), Russian painter

Arts, entertainment, and media

Music
 Cush (band), American alternative Christian music band featuring Michael Knott
 Kush (band), American rap metal band 
 Kush (group), Australian rock group from the 1970s
 "Kush" (song), a 2010 single by Dr. Dre
 The Kush, a 2007 album by the rapper Havoc

Other arts, entertainment, and media
 Kush (Conan), a nation in the fictional world of Conan the Barbarian
 Kush (film), 2007 independent action-thriller film
 "Kush" (Sanctuary), an episode of the science fiction series Sanctuary
 KUSH, a radio station (1600 AM) licensed to serve Cushing, Oklahoma, United States
 Kush Games, a now-defunct game development studio

Plants 
 Kush (Cannabis), a family of potent cannabis strains named for the Hindu Kush
 Kusha grass, Desmostachya bipinnata, a perennial grass species

Other uses
 Kush (maize), a cornmeal preparation similar to grits or polenta
 Kush Housing Association, a social landlord in London, England
 Synthetic cannabinoids, artificial drugs sometimes known as kush
 Kush (red panda), a male red panda known for escaping Curraghs Wildlife Park

See also
 Cushitic languages, Afro-Asiatic language family spoken in parts of Africa
 Hindukush (disambiguation)
 Koosh ball, a toy ball made of rubber filaments attached to a soft rubber core
 Kusha (disambiguation)
 Kushan Empire, an empire in South Asia in the 1st century CE
 Kushi (disambiguation)
 Qush (disambiguation)